Events from the year 1975 in Japan.  It corresponds to Shōwa 50 (昭和50年) in the Japanese calendar.

Incumbents
Emperor: Hirohito
Prime Minister: Takeo Miki (Liberal Democratic)
Chief Cabinet Secretary: Ichitaro Ide
Chief Justice of the Supreme Court: Tomokazu Murakami
President of the House of Representatives: Shigesaburō Maeo
President of the House of Councillors: Kenzō Kōno
Diet sessions: 75th (regular session opened on December 27, 1974, to July 4), 76th (extraordinary, September 11 to December 25), 77th (regular, December 27 to May 24, 1976)

Governors
Aichi Prefecture: Mikine Kuwahara (until 14 February); Yoshiaki Nakaya (starting 15 February)
Akita Prefecture: Yūjirō Obata 
Aomori Prefecture: Shunkichi Takeuchi 
Chiba Prefecture: Taketo Tomonō (until 16 April); Kiichi Kawakami (starting 17 April)
Ehime Prefecture: Haruki Shiraishi 
Fukui Prefecture: Heidayū Nakagawa 
Fukuoka Prefecture: Hikaru Kamei 
Fukushima Prefecture: Morie Kimura
Gifu Prefecture: Saburō Hirano 
Gunma Prefecture: Konroku Kanda 
Hiroshima Prefecture: Hiroshi Miyazawa 
Hokkaido: Naohiro Dōgakinai 
Hyogo Prefecture: Tokitada Sakai
Ibaraki Prefecture: Nirō Iwakami (until 22 April); Fujio Takeuchi (starting 23 April)
Ishikawa Prefecture: Yōichi Nakanishi 
Iwate Prefecture: Tadashi Chida 
Kagawa Prefecture: Tadao Maekawa 
Kagoshima Prefecture: Saburō Kanemaru 
Kanagawa Prefecture: Bunwa Tsuda (until 22 April); Kazuji Nagasu (starting 23 April)
Kochi Prefecture: Masumi Mizobuchi (until 6 December); Chikara Nakauchi (starting 7 December)
Kumamoto Prefecture: Issei Sawada 
Kyoto Prefecture: Torazō Ninagawa 
Mie Prefecture: Ryōzō Tagawa 
Miyagi Prefecture: Sōichirō Yamamoto 
Miyazaki Prefecture: Hiroshi Kuroki 
Nagano Prefecture: Gon'ichirō Nishizawa 
Nagasaki Prefecture: Kan'ichi Kubo 
Nara Prefecture: Ryozo Okuda 
Niigata Prefecture: Takeo Kimi 
Oita Prefecture: Masaru Taki 
Okayama Prefecture: Shiro Nagano 
Okinawa Prefecture: Chōbyō Yara 
Osaka Prefecture: Ryōichi Kuroda 
Saga Prefecture: Sunao Ikeda 
Saitama Prefecture: Yawara Hata 
Shiga Prefecture: Masayoshi Takemura 
Shiname Prefecture: Seiji Tsunematsu 
Shizuoka Prefecture: Keizaburō Yamamoto 
Tochigi Prefecture: Yuzuru Funada 
Tokushima Prefecture: Yasunobu Takeichi 
Tokyo: Ryōkichi Minobe 
Tottori Prefecture: Kōzō Hirabayashi 
Toyama Prefecture: Kokichi Nakada 
Wakayama Prefecture: Masao Ohashi (until 4 October); Shirō Kariya (starting 23 November)
Yamagata Prefecture: Seiichirō Itagaki 
Yamaguchi Prefecture: Masayuki Hashimoto 
Yamanashi Prefecture: Kunio Tanabe

Events
January 1 – A hotel bus plunges into Lake Aoki in Nagano Prefecture, killing 24.
March 10 – Sanyo Shinkansen officially open between Okayama Station to Hakata Station of Fukuoka. 
July 20 – opening of Expo '75 in Okinawa.
August 17–18 – Typhoon Phyllis, where hit on landslide, debris flow, flood swept hit in Kochi Prefecture, Shikoku Island, killing 77 persons and 209 persons injures, according to Japan Fire and Disaster Management official confirmed report. 
November 2–8 – 1975 Japan Open Tennis Championships held in Tokyo.
November 3 – Miss International 1975 held at Expo Portside Theater, Motobu, Okinawa.
November 26 to December 3 – Japanese National Railways mandatory implementation an eight-day-long illegal "strike for the right to strike".
December 12 – In Osaka International Airport of Itami, where takeoff and landing of civilian aircraft before 7 o'clock and after 21 o'clock was forbidden, that caused by noise complaints from residents triggered.
December 31 – 17th Japan Record Awards held in Tokyo.

Films
Banned Book: Flesh Futon
Cruelty: Black Rose Torture
Dersu Uzala, directed by Akira Kurosawa
Graveyard of Honor, directed by Kinji Fukasaku
Hans Christian Andersen's The Little Mermaid, directed by Tomoharu Katsumata
Kamen Rider Amazon
Kamen Rider Stronger
Karayuki-san, the Making of a Prostitute, directed by Shohei Imamura
Oryu's Passion: Bondage Skin
The Return of the Sister Street Fighter, directed by Kazuhiko Yamaguchi
Terror of Mechagodzilla, directed by Ishirō Honda
Tokyo Emmanuelle
Tora-san's Rise and Fall, directed by Yoji Yamada
Tora-san, the Intellectual, directed by Yoji Yamada
A Woman Called Sada Abe, directed by Noboru Tanaka

Births
 January 1 – Eiichiro Oda, illustrator and author (One Piece)
 January 6 – Yukana, voice actress and singer
 January 8 – Reiko Chiba, actress
 January 28 – Hiroshi Kamiya, voice actor
 January 30 – Yumi Yoshimura, singer (Puffy Amiyumi)
 February 6 – Tomoko Kawase, singer
 February 16 – Nanase Aikawa, singer 
 February 17 – Michiko Kichise, actress
 February 10 – Hiroki Kuroda, baseball pitcher
 February 25 – Chiemi Chiba, voice actress
 April 3
 Koji Uehara, baseball pitcher
 Yoshinobu Takahashi, professional baseball player
 April 14 – Takayoshi Tanimoto, singer 
 April 16 – Megumi Ōhara, voice actress  
 April 27 – Kazuyoshi Funaki, ski jumper
 May 19 – Mitsutoshi Shimabukuro, manga artist (Seikimatsu Leader den Takeshi!, Toriko)
 May 26 – Tsuruno Takeshi, actor and singer 
 June 22 – Yuka Itaya, actress
 July 5 – Ai Sugiyama, tennis player
 July 11 – Riona Hazuki, actress
 July 22 – Kenshin Kawakami, baseball pitcher
 August 1 – Ryoko Yonekura, actress
 August 11 – Kishō Taniyama, voice actor
 August 24 – Hayato Sakurai, martial artist
 August 28 – Yūko Gotō, voice actress
 September 6 – Ryoko Tani, judoka
 November 11 – Daisuke Ohata, rugby union player
 November 15 – Hiromi Ominami, long-distance runner 
 November 16 – Yuki Uchida, actress
 December 12 – Kuwashima Houko, voice actress
 December 15 – Haruna Ikezawa, actress and voice actress
 December 16 – Masaki Sumitani, television performer
 December 30 – Yoma Komatsu, singer

Deaths
 February 11 – Hideo Shinojima, footballer (b. 1910)
 May 30 – Tatsuo Shimabuku, martial artist and founder of Isshin-ryu karate (b. 1908)
 June 3 – Eisaku Satō, Prime Minister of Japan, recipient of the Nobel Peace Prize (b. 1901)
 November 20 – Tokushichi Mishima, inventor and engineer (b. 1893)

See also
 1975 in Japanese television
 List of Japanese films of 1975

References

 
1970s in Japan
Years of the 20th century in Japan